Sara Dossena (born 21 November 1984) is an Italian long-distance runner, who won a gold medal at the 2018 Mediterranean Games. She also won three national championships (10.000 m track, 10 km road and cross country). In 2019, she competed in the women's marathon at the 2019 World Athletics Championships held in Doha, Qatar. She did not finish her race.

Career

Cross country running
In 2015, Dossena won the Italian Cross Country Championships.

Road racing 
In her first marathon, Dossena finished 6th at the 2017 New York City Marathon.

Track racing
In 2017, she was Italian 10,000 metres champion.

Multi-sport
Dossena has been the Italian triathlon champion and duathlon champion.

Achievements

National titles
 Italian Athletics Championships
 10,000 metres: 2017
 10 km road 2018
Italian Cross Country Championships
Senior race: 2015

Marathon
At March 2019 she disputed three marathon.

See also
Italian all-time lists - Marathon

References

External links
 
 

Living people
1984 births
People from Clusone
Italian female long-distance runners
Italian female marathon runners
Italian female triathletes
Duathletes
Mediterranean Games gold medalists for Italy
Athletes (track and field) at the 2018 Mediterranean Games
Mediterranean Games medalists in athletics
World Athletics Championships athletes for Italy
Italian female cross country runners
Mediterranean Games gold medalists in athletics
Sportspeople from the Province of Bergamo